The 1824 United States presidential election in Rhode Island took place between October 26 and December 2, 1824, as part of the 1824 United States presidential election. Voters chose four representatives, or electors to the Electoral College, who voted for President and Vice President.

During this election, the Democratic-Republican Party was the only major national party, and 4 different candidates from this party sought the Presidency. Rhode Island voted for John Quincy Adams over William H. Crawford, Henry Clay, and Andrew Jackson. Adams won Rhode Island by a margin of 82.94%.

Results

See also
 United States presidential elections in Rhode Island

References

Rhode Island
1824
1824 Rhode Island elections